Paulo Gomes de Matos (born 25 January 1984) is a Brazilian former footballer who played as a forward.

Club career
On 19 June 2005, Matos debuted for São Paulo alongside future Brazil international Hernanes, scoring in a 1–0 win against Botafogo. After his retirement, he would regard that moment as the best in his career.

On 26 November 2005, Matos played for Náutico in that year's Série B promotion play-off final against Grêmio; the match was dubbed the Batalha dos Aflitos, and was played at the Estádio dos Aflitos. During the match, Náutico received two penalties, and Grêmio had four players with red cards, yet Gremio won 1–0. After that game, Matos became depressed, barely slept or ate, did not speak to anybody for two weeks, and vowed to never to go near that stadium again.

References

External links
 
 Paulo Matos at playmakerstats.com (English version of ogol.com.br)

1984 births
Living people
Association football forwards
Brazilian footballers
Estrela do Norte Futebol Clube players
Al Ansar FC players
Associação Desportiva Confiança players
Paraná Clube players
Goianésia Esporte Clube players
Lebanese Premier League players
Brazilian expatriate footballers
Expatriate footballers in Lebanon
Brazilian expatriate sportspeople in Lebanon